The King Abdullah Bridge is an inoperative bridge over the Jordan River between the West Bank and Jordan. It is about 5 kilometers south east of Jericho, and about 4 kilometers south of the Allenby Bridge. It has been known to be a landmark development within the region.

History
The bridge was built in the 1950s, along with the reconstruction of a road between Jerusalem and Amman, at a point where the distance between the two cities is the shortest, about 60 km. Today, that road is numbered "Highway 1" in Israel, "Road 40" on the Jordanian side. The bridge is named after King Abdullah I of Jordan.

During the Six-Day War, on 7 June 1967, a section of the bridge was destroyed by the Harel Brigade of the IDF and it became unusable.

Today
, the bridge has not been rebuilt yet and the Allenby Bridge, just north of it, remains the major crossing point between Israel and Jordan. If the bridge is ever rebuilt, the travel time by car between Jerusalem and Amman would only be about 45 minutes, as the majority of road on both sides of the River Jordan is now a dual carriageway.

References

Bridges in Jordan
Bridges over the Jordan River
Jordan–West Bank border crossings